Simply Eva is the eighth posthumous album by Eva Cassidy, released on 25 January 2011, fifteen years after her death in 1996. It's a collection of 11 acoustic tracks with Cassidy herself on the guitar and an a cappella version of "I Know You By Heart". The Blues Alley version of "Over the Rainbow", which was not included in the Live at Blues Alley album, is on this album. Digital downloads include the Christmas single "Silent Night" as a bonus track. Simply Eva hit #4 on the UK Charts on February 13, 2011, and was certified silver and gold on February 18, 2011. The album debuted at #52 on the Canadian Albums Chart.

Track listing 
 "Songbird" (Christine McVie)
 "Wayfaring Stranger" (Traditional; arranged by Eva Cassidy)
 "People Get Ready" (Curtis Mayfield)
 "True Colors" (Billy Steinberg, Tom Kelly)
 "Who Knows Where the Time Goes" (Sandy Denny)
 "Over the Rainbow" (E.Y. Harburg, Harold Arlen)
 "Kathy’s Song" (Paul Simon)
 "San Francisco Bay Blues" (Jesse Fuller)
 "Wade in the Water" (Traditional; arranged by Eva Cassidy)
 "Time After Time" (Cyndi Lauper, Rob Hyman)
 "Autumn Leaves" (Jacques Prévert, Johnny Mercer, Joseph Kosma)
 "I Know You By Heart" (a cappella) (Diane Scanlon, Eve Nelson)

Charts

Weekly charts

Year-end charts

References

 Official Eva Cassidy "Simply Eva" Album Website Blix Street
 Eva Cassidy Website Managed by Laura Bligh, Eva's cousin
 Eva Cassidy Artwork Website Includes Artwork, Albums, Songbooks, Biography "Songbird"
 ABC Nightline Feature on Eva Cassidy
 Blix Street Records Eva Cassidy Page
 Eva Cassidy "Simply Eva" NPR News NPR
 BBC Music Review BBC
 "Simply Eva" Review Muruch
 The late singing star Eva Cassidy showcased on new acoustic album Crossrhythms
 Eva Cassidy is the voice that has enchanted listeners worldwide Glasswerk UK
 Blix Street to release "Simply Eva" by Eva Cassidy CD Insight
 Eva Cassidy's "Simply Eva" is BBC's Album of the Week
 Eva Cassidy - Simply Eva Direct Current
 Eva Cassidy: New album "Simply Eva" Fame Magazine

2011 albums
Eva Cassidy albums
Albums published posthumously